Arts, Sciences and Technology University in Lebanon (AUL), is an independent and nondenominational Lebanese higher education institution with undergraduate and graduate degree programs.

The main campus of the university is in Cola, Beirut. AUL has a branch in Jadra, south of Beirut and five study centers in Sin el Fil, Qalamoun - North Lebanon, Kaslik, Dekwaneh and Chtoura.

History

AUL started under the name of “Business and Computer University College” (BCU) with two faculties but later expanded by adding the faculty of Arts and Humanities to the Business Administration, and Sciences and Fine Arts faculties thus gaining the university status and changed its name to meet the expansion of its major offerings.

In 2007, BCU changed to become Arts, Sciences and Technology University in Lebanon (AUL); including 3 major faculties:

Faculty of Business Administration.
Faculty of Sciences and Fine Arts.
Faculty of Arts and Humanities.

Accreditation and Recognitions

AUL is accredited by the Lebanese Ministry of Higher Education (2000) (MHE). That accreditation includes undergraduate and graduate levels.

AUL is a member of the European Council for Business Education(ECBE), Arab Organization for Admission & registration of universities in Arab Nation (ACRAO), International Council for Hotels, Restaurants & Institutional Education,  and the Association of Collegiate Business Schools and Programs.

AUL Jadra Campus offers the American University for Humanities Degree Programs. An autonomous Program of Liberal Education within the university's global network. The program is fully accredited by the American Academy for Liberal Education (AALE), a national accrediting agency recognized by the US Secretary of Education.

Faculties

Faculty of Business Administration 

 B.A. in Accounting
 B.A. in Banking and Finance
 B.A. in Management
 B.A. in Management Information Systems
 B.A. in Marketing and Advertising
 B.A. in Hospitality Management
 B.A. in Events Management
 B.A. in Travel Management
 Master of Business Administration (MBA)
 Masters of Executive Business Administration (EMBA)

Faculty of Sciences & Fine Arts

The Faculty of Sciences and Fine Arts houses 12 academic departments and programs in three separate divisions:

The Division of Computer Science & Engineering with the following departments:

 BS.  Computer Science.
 BS.  Information and Communication Technology (previously Computer Communication).
 BSE. Computer Communication Engineering.
 MS.  Master of Science in Computer Science & Communication.

The Division of Fine Arts with the following departments:

 BS. Graphic Design
 BS. Interior Design

The Division of Basic Sciences with the following departments:

 BS. Chemistry
 BS. Physics
 BS. Biology
 BS. Environmental Sciences
 BS. Mathematics
 BS. Statistical Mathematics
 BS. Actuarial Mathematics

Faculty of Arts & Humanities

 B.A. in Anthropology
 B.A. in Arabic Literature
 B.A. in Communication Arts
 B.A. in English Literature
 B.A. in Performance Arts
 B.A. in Religious Studies
 B.A. in Sociology
 Teaching Diploma

International Relations

MEMBERSHIPS:

Members in American Academy for Liberal Education (AALE)
 
European Council for business Education (ECBE)

Arab Organization for Admission & registration of universities in Arab Nation (ACRAO)

Intl. Council for Hotels, Restaurant & Institutional Education (I-CHRIE)

AFFILIATIONS:

Emporia State University USA

Cezar Ritz SWITZERLAND

Leeds Met. University U.K

Perpignan University FRANCE

FANCHAWE University CANADA

American University for Humanities USA

Ecole Nationale d’Ingénieurs de Brest (ENIB), France

Telecom Bretagne, France

Université de Grenoble, France

Wales University, School of Electronic Engineering, Bangor, UK

Wales University, School of Computer Science, Bangor, UK

University of Atlanta, USA, Atlanta

References

Universities in Lebanon
Education in Beirut
Educational institutions established in 1998
1998 establishments in Lebanon